Subhash Chandra Garg (born 16 October 1960) is a 1983 batch IAS officer of Rajasthan cadre. He served as Economic Affairs Secretary and Finance Secretary of India. He has also served as an executive director in the World Bank.

Education 
Garg has graduate degrees in Law (LLB) and Commerce (BCom) from Rajasthan University from Government College, Ajmer. Garg is a professionally qualified Cost & Management Accountant. In addition, Garg is a qualified Company Secretary and received gold medal in 1990.

Career 
Garg has served in various key positions for both the Union Government and the Government of Rajasthan, like as Principal Secretary (Finance), Commissioner (Investment and NRIs) Secretary (Budget), Secretary (Expenditure), managing director of Rajasthan State Road Transport Corporation (RSRTC), managing director of Rajasthan State Seeds Corporation (RSSCL), Special Secretary (Mines and Energy) and Chief Executive and Director of Rajasthan Energy Development Corporation (REDC), Registrar of University of Rajasthan, and as the District Magistrate and Collector of Rajsamand district in the Government of Rajasthan, and as the Union Economic Affairs Secretary, Additional Secretary in the Cabinet Secretariat, Joint Secretary in the Department of Expenditure of Ministry of Finance, Joint Secretary in the Department of Agriculture and Cooperation in the Ministry of Agriculture and Farmers Welfare and as a Director in the Department of Economic Affairs in the Ministry of Finance in the Union Government.

Garg also served as an Executive Director in the World Bank.

In addition, Garg had a stint with the National Institute of Public Finance and Policy, on deputation, as a Principal Consultant, under Rule 6(2)(ii) of The Indian Administrative Service (Cadre) Rules, 1954.

Executive director in World Bank 
Garg was appointed as an executive director in the World Bank by the Appointments Committee of the Cabinet (ACC) for a tenure of three years, Garg assumed the office of executive director on 10 September 2014, and demitted on 21 June 2017, because of his appointment as the Union Economic Affairs Secretary.

Economic affairs secretary 
Garg was appointed as the Union Economic Affairs Secretary by the Appointments Committee of the Cabinet (ACC) in June 2017, he assumed the office of the Secretary on 12 July 2017.

References

External links 
 Executive Record Sheet as maintained by Department of Personnel and Training of Government of India
 Officer Service History as maintained by Department of Personnel of Government of Rajasthan
 Executive Profile on Bloomberg

Indian Administrative Service officers
People from Jaipur
People from Jaipur district
Living people
1960 births